Albertus Parisiensis, also known as Albert of Paris, was a French cantor and composer. He is credited with creating the first known piece of European music for three voices.

Life and career
Parisiensis was probably born in Estampes in the Arrondissement of Mirande. He served as canon at Notre Dame de Paris from 1127 and as cantor by 1146, a position he held until his death in 1177, the only period of his life which has been documented. He left a number of liturgical books to the cathedral.

The only extant piece of his is the conductus Congaudeant Catholici. The piece was part of the Codex Calixtinus, a work intended as a guide for travelers making the Way of St. James, a pilgrimage to a shrine in Santiago de Compostela.  Congaudeant Catholici has been recorded by a number of groups devoted to medieval music, including Sequentia, The Rose Ensemble and others.

Selected recordings
The Age of Cathedrals with Paul Hillier and Theatre of Voices, Harmonia Mundi, HMU 907157.

References

Citations

Sources
  
 

1177 deaths
12th-century French composers
Medieval male composers
French classical composers
French male classical composers
Year of birth unknown